Ashfaq Ahmed (22 August 1925 – 7 September 2004) was a Pakistani writer, playwright and broadcaster from Pakistan. His works in Urdu included novels, short stories and plays for television and radio of Pakistan. He received the President's Pride of Performance and Sitara-i-Imtiaz (Star of Excellence) awards for his everlasting services in the field of broadcasting and literary heritage of Pakistan.

Early life
Ahmed was born on 22 August 1925 in Muktsar, Punjab, British India, in an ethnic Pashtun family of the Mohmand tribe. His early education was in Muktsar.

Shortly before the partition of India in 1947, he migrated to Pakistan and settled in Lahore, Punjab. He completed a Master of Arts degree in Urdu literature from Government College Lahore. Bano Qudsia, his wife and companion in Urdu literary circles, was his classmate at the Government College.

Ahmed travelled widely and could speak Punjabi, Urdu, English, Italian and French.

Career
As a boy he wrote stories, which were published in Phool (Flower), a magazine for children. After returning to Pakistan from Europe, he took out his own monthly literary magazine, Dastaango (Story Teller), and joined Radio Pakistan as a script writer. He was made editor of the popular Urdu weekly, Lail-o-Nahar [Day and Night], in place of famous poet Sufi Ghulam Mustafa Tabassum by the Government of Pakistan.

In 1962, Ashfaq Ahmed started his radio program, Talqeen Shah (The Preacher) which made him popular among the people in towns and villages. He was appointed director of the Markazi Urdu Board in 1966, which was later renamed as Urdu Science Board, a post he held for 29 years. He remained with the board until 1979. He also served as an adviser in the Education Ministry during Zia-ul-Haq's regime.

Ahmed wrote over thirty books. His short story (afsana), Gaddarya (The Shepherd) earned him early fame in 1955.

From his own resources, he created the Central Board for the Development of Urdu in Lahore.

Radio plays
Talqeen Shah (1962)
Baithak (The Guest Room)

Television shows
Uchhay Burj Lahore De / 
Tali Thallay / 
Tota Kahani (1970s) / 
Aik Mohabbat Sau Afsanay (1975–76) / 
Aur Dramay / 
Zavia /

Books 

 Zaviya / 
 Zaviya 2 / 
 Zaviya 3 / 
 Aik Mohabbat Sau Afsanay / 
 Mann Chalay Ka Sauda / 
 Gadaria: Ujley Phool /
 Safar e Maina /
 Tahli Thalley /
 Mehman Bahaar /
 Vidaa e Jang / 
 Changez Khan ke Sunehri Shaheen / 
 Khattya Wattya / 
 Tota Kahani / 
 Qumkaar / 
 Garma Garm / 
 Haft Zabani Lughaat / 
 Doosron Se Nibah / 
 Aik Hi Boli / 
 Subhaney Fasaney / 
 Band Gali / 
 Mehman Saraey / 
 Baba Sahiba / 
 Safar Dar Safar / 
 Ucche Burj Lahore De / 
 Tilisam Hosh Afza / 
 Aur Dramey / 
 Nange Paun / 
 Hasrat Tameer / 
 Jang Bajang / 
 Aik Muhabbat So Dramey / 
 Hairat Kadah / 
 Shaahla Kot / 
 Khel Tamasha / 
 Guldaan / 
 Dheenga Mushti / 
 Shora Shori / 
 Dhandora / 
 Arz e Musannif / 
 Fankar / 
 Mukhtalif Mashron Mein Aurat Ki Hasiyat /

Later years, death and legacy 

Later in life, Ahmed’s devotion to Sufism grew. His close association with Qudrat Ullah Shahab and Mumtaz Mufti, Baba Mohammad Yahya Khan was also attributed to this tendency. He used to get together with his fans in PTV program Baithak (The Guest Room) and Zaviya (The Angle) where he gave swift but satisfying responses to each and every question posed by the youth audience.

On 7 September 2004, Ahmed died of pancreatic cancer. He was buried in Model Town, Lahore, Pakistan.

In November 2004, Allama Iqbal Open University staff organized an event in Islamabad to pay tributes to Ahmed. At this event, Chairman, National Language Authority, Fateh Muhammad Malik stated that with the death of Ashfaq Ahmed, a vacuum had been created in the literary world of Pakistan. Chairman, Pakistan Academy of Letters, Iftikhar Arif also paid tribute to him as a dynamic literary figure and said that one of his priorities had always remained welfare of the people.

Awards and recognition 
 Pride of Performance Award (1979)
 Sitara-i-Imtiaz Award by the President of Pakistan

See also
 List of Pakistani writers
 List of Urdu language writers

References

External links
 

1925 births
2004 deaths
Pakistani radio writers
Pakistan Television Corporation people
Pakistani scholars
Urdu-language writers
Pakistani novelists
Pakistani dramatists and playwrights
Urdu-language novelists
Pakistani male short story writers
Urdu-language short story writers
Government College University, Lahore alumni
Pakistani literary critics
Pakistani radio personalities
Recipients of the Pride of Performance
Recipients of Sitara-i-Imtiaz
Nigar Award winners
Deaths from cancer in Pakistan
Deaths from gallbladder cancer
Pashtun people
Writers from Lahore
Radio personalities from Lahore
20th-century novelists
20th-century Pakistani short story writers
20th-century Pakistani male writers
Members of the Pakistan Philosophical Congress
Pakistani Muslims
20th-century Pakistani philosophers